Yalimo Regency is one of the regencies in the Indonesian province of Highland Papua. It covers an area of 4,320.29 km3, and had a population at the 2010 Census of 50,763 which doubled to reach 101,973 at the 2020 Census; the official estimate as at mid 2021 was 103,387. The indigenous inhabitants of this well-forested mountainous area are the Yali people.

Administrative districts
Yalimo Regency comprises five districts (distrik), tabulated below with their areas and their populations at the 2010 Census and the 2020 Census, together with the official estimates as at mid 2021. The table also includes the locations of the district administrative centres, the number of administrative villages (desa) in each district, and its post code.

Climate
Elelim, the seat of the regency has a tropical rainforest climate (Af) with heavy rainfall all year round.

References

External links
Statistics publications from Statistics Indonesia (BPS)

Regencies of Highland Papua